Stephen Gould is an American heldentenor, born in Virginia in 1962. He graduated from Olivet Nazarene University with a Bachelor of Arts in 1984.

Early in his career, in 1989, he was a stand-in for a sick Chris Merritt in Los Angeles Opera's Tancredi, singing opposite Marilyn Horne. Later his work included musical theater, but in 2006 he performed the title role of Siegfried in Wagner's Der Ring des Nibelungen at the Bayreuth Festival. However, "Tannhäuser's character is more appropriate to me than Siegfried", said Gould to Forum Opéra in December 2007. In 2009 Gould sang in several opera houses, including Korngold's Die tote Stadt in London, Peter Grimes in Geneva, Tannhäuser at Las Palmas and also in Rome, Otello in Tokyo, and Der Ring des Nibelungen at the Vienna State Opera.

References

External links
Official site
Concert performance of finale of Siegfried on YouTube (Elizabeth Connell as Brunnhilde).

American operatic tenors
Olivet Nazarene University alumni
Singers from Virginia
20th-century American male opera singers
21st-century American male opera singers
Classical musicians from Virginia
Österreichischer Kammersänger

Living people

1962 births